Paintbrush Divide is a pedestrian mountain pass located in the Teton Range, Grand Teton National Park, in the U.S. state of Wyoming.

References

Mountain passes of Wyoming
Mountain passes of Teton County, Wyoming